Newark, the largest city in New Jersey and second largest in New York metropolitan area, is one of the United States' major air, shipping, and rail hubs. It has a distinctive skyline, though shorter than that of much larger New York City and slightly smaller Jersey City. Since the mid-2000s numerous buildings have been re-lit and made more prominent. Newark was founded in 1666, and its downtown grew around the site of the early settlement at Four Corners. Early highrises were developed there and at Military Park during the economic boom of the Roaring Twenties. In the New Newark  era (1950s-1970s) modernist buildings went up, particularly around Washington Park. In the post-industrial-high tech era, development has been concentrated in the Gateway District near Penn Station. Clusters of residential highrises (not included in this list) are found throughout the city, particularly near Weequahic Park and Branch Brook Park.

Tallest buildings

.

Timeline of tallest buildings since 1868

This lists buildings that once held the title of tallest building in Newark.

Proposed and under construction
Grant USA Tower would have been the tallest building in the United States had it been built.
This lists buildings that are proposed for construction.

See also
List of tallest buildings in New Jersey
List of tallest buildings in Jersey City
List of tallest buildings in Atlantic City
List of tallest buildings in Fort Lee
List of tallest buildings in New Brunswick
List of tallest buildings in Camden
Newark Public Service Terminal
Robert Treat Center
Pavilion and Colonnade Apartments

External links
Graph of New Jersey's twelve tallest buildings
Old Newark.com office building images
Newark skycraper photos
BCDC Newark buildings and sites
Emporis Top Twenty

Panorama
.

References
General
Emporis.com - Newark
Skyscraperpage.com - Newark
Specific

Newark

Towers in New Jersey
History of Newark, New Jersey
Tourist attractions in Essex County, New Jersey
Architecture in New Jersey
Newark